Naache Mayuri is a 1986 dance biographical Hindi film directed by T. Rama Rao. It is a remake of the Telugu film, Mayuri (1984), about classical dancer-actress Sudha Chandran who stars as herself in both films.

The film was shot at Mehboob Studio, Chandivali Studio and Film City in Mumbai. Art direction was by Sudhendu Roy and dances were choreographed by Gopi Krishna.

Plot
Mayuri is a real story of Bharatanatyam dancer Sudha Chandran, who lost her leg in an accident on her way to Trichy to Chennai in June 1981. The story depicts how she received an artificial Jaipur foot and eventually learned to dance again, triumphing over her fate, and ultimately becoming very successful in her life.

Cast
 Sudha Chandran as Mayuri
 Shekhar Suman
 Aruna Irani as Durga
 Dina Pathak 
 Satyen Kappu
 Sushma Seth 
 Vinod Nagpal
 Mayuri Sudha
 Yunus Parvez
 Tabassum
 Viju Khote

Music
The film has music by Laxmikant–Pyarelal, with lyrics by Anand Bakshi.

 "Chal Hat Chal Kal Phir Milne Ka Mang Na Mujhse Vaada" - Lata Mangeshkar
 "Jhoom Jhoom Nach Mayuri" - Lata Mangeshkar
 "Na Tum Ne Kiya Na Maine Kiya" - Suresh Wadkar, Lata Mangeshkar
 "Pag Paadam Sangeet Geet Sargam" - S. Janaki
 "Paijaniya Bol" - Lata Mangeshkar
 "Sadhana Aradhana Meri" - Lata Mangeshkar

References

External links
 

Films directed by T. Rama Rao
Films scored by Laxmikant–Pyarelal
1986 films
Indian biographical films
Indian dance films
Hindi remakes of Telugu films
1980s Hindi-language films
Films about amputees
Films shot in Maharashtra
Films scored by S. P. Balasubrahmanyam
1980s biographical films